Ryan Finley is an American businessman and the founder of SurveyMonkey, an online survey software provider.

Education
Finley holds a BS degree in computer science from the University of Wisconsin–Madison.

Career
Finley founded SurveyMonkey in 1999, growing the company to $30 million in sales.

In 2009, Ryan sold SurveyMonkey to a private equity firm, however, he remains working at the company.

References

Living people
University of Wisconsin–Madison alumni
Businesspeople in software
American software engineers
Technology company founders
Year of birth missing (living people)